A by-election occurred for the New South Wales Legislative Assembly seat of Heffron on Saturday 25 August 2012. This was triggered by the resignation of former Premier of New South Wales Kristina Keneally which she announced on 23 June 2012. Labor easily retained the seat with an increased margin. Ron Hoenig received a 60 percent primary and 70 percent two-candidate preferred vote.

The by-election was held on the same day as the Northern Territory election.

Dates

Background
Labor retained the seat of Heffron at the election in March 2011 with a primary vote of 41.2 percent and a two-party-preferred vote of 57.1 percent – the sixth-safest of Labor's 20 seats won at the election of the 93 seats in the Legislative Assembly. The s won 33.3 percent of the primary vote in Heffron, the  won 19.0 percent, the CDP won 1.9 percent, with the remaining 4.6 percent to two independent candidates. There was a 16.3 percent two-party-preferred swing away from the Liberal/National Coalition government at the November 2011 Clarence by-election. The Liberals did not contest the Heffron by-election.

Candidates
The four candidates in ballot paper order were as follows:

Results

Kristina Keneally resigned.

External links

See also
Electoral results for the district of Heffron
List of New South Wales state by-elections

References

2012 elections in Australia
New South Wales state by-elections
2010s in New South Wales